East Hampshire is a local government district in Hampshire, England. Its council is based in Petersfield. Other towns are Alton and Bordon.

The district was originally to be known as the District Council of Petersfield.  It comprised 42 seats and first met on 18 June 1973.  For ten months it operated alongside the councils that it was formed to replace: the Alton and Petersfield urban districts along with Alton Rural District and Petersfield Rural District.

On 8 October 1973, the new council changed its name to the current East Hampshire District Council (or EHDC as it is usually known).

On 1 April 1974, the old councils were dissolved, leaving only EHDC.

Sandy Hopkins was the first joint Chief Executive in Hampshire when she was appointed to head both EHDC and Havant Borough Council in October 2009.

Councillors approved the business case put forward by the Chief Executive for a shared management team between the two authorities in June 2010.

The new team took up its position in October 2010 and consists of five Executive Heads reporting to two Executive Directors. This is a reduction in senior management from 15 to 7 positions.

Politics

East Hampshire District Council is elected every four years, with currently 43 councillors being elected at each election. The Conservative party has controlled the council for much of its history including having a majority from 1976 to 1991, with the only other party to have had a majority being the Liberal Democrats from 1991 to 1999. Most recently the Conservatives have controlled the council since the 1999 election, and as of the 2019 election the council is composed of the following councillors:

Settlements and parishes
For a list of civil parishes in East Hampshire, see List of civil parishes in Hampshire#East Hampshire.

Settlements in East Hampshire include:

Alton
Beech, Bentley, Bentworth, Binsted, Blackmoor, Blendworth, Bordon, Bramshott, Bucks Horn Oak, Buriton
Catherington, Chawton, Clanfield, Colemore
East Meon, East Tisted, East Worldham, Empshott
Farringdon, Finchdean, Four Marks, Froxfield
Golden Pot, Grayshott, Greatham
Hawkley, Headley, Headley Down, High Cross, Holybourne, Horndean
Kingsley
Langrish, Lasham, Lindford, Liphook, Liss, Lower Froyle, Lower Wield
Medstead
Neatham, Newton Valence, North Street
Petersfield, Priors Dean
Ropley, Ropley Dean, Rowlands Castle
Selborne, Shalden, Sheet, Steep, Stroud
Upper Froyle, Upper Wield
West Tisted, West Worldham, Weston, Whitehill

References

External links
 East Hampshire District Council's website
 News and events in East Hampshire
 Hampshire County Council: East Hampshire parish boundaries (map)

 
Non-metropolitan districts of Hampshire